Alexandra Mousavizadeh (born 18 Sept 1970) is a Danish economist and CEO of Evident. Prior to June 2022 she was a partner at Tortoise Media in London and creator of The Responsibility100 Index and The Global AI Index. She specializes in index creation, using data to build benchmarks that rank nations, companies and other entities on key social and technological issues. A former sovereign risk analyst at Moody's and co-head of country risk management at Morgan Stanley, she is also the Former CEO of Arc Ratings, and the Former Director of the Prosperity Index, a comprehensive ranking of the prosperity of more than 140 countries published annually by the London-based Legatum Institute.

Early life 

Mousavizadeh was born in Copenhagen to a Danish father, Steen Bream Vedel, and an English mother, Susanna Foster Dickson Vedel. Her grandfather, Sir William Dickson was Marshal of the Royal Air Force and Chief of the Defence Staff and a Knight Commander of the British Empire; through him she is a direct descendant of Lord Nelson.

She was educated in Denmark, and Down House boarding school in Berkshire, England before to returning to Denmark to attend N. Zahle's School in Copenhagen. From 1989 to 1994 she attended the University of Copenhagen, graduating with an MA in Economics.

Career 
Mousavizadeh began her career at the Danish Ministry of Foreign Affairs, in the Department for Humanitarian and Development Funding. After this role, she was a visiting Research Scholar at the Centre for Strategic and International Studies in Washington DC.

Moody's
Mousavizadeh then worked for Moody's for 10 years. Based in New York, she covered Emerging and Frontier Markets for the Sovereign Risk team. She then moved to Morgan Stanley in London as Head of Country Risk Management for EMEA, before returning to Moody's as Assistant Vice President for the Africa sovereign ratings portfolio. Alexandra is also the co-founder of the Global Disinformation Index.

The Prosperity Index
Alexandra acted as Director of the Legatum Prosperity Index; an annual ranking developed by the Legatum Institute, a division of the private investment firm Legatum. The ranking is based on a variety of factors including wealth, economic growth, education, health, personal well-being, and quality of life. In the 2018 rankings, 149 countries were ranked, and Norway topped the list, followed by New Zealand and Finland. Afghanistan was in last place. In 2013, twenty-seven of the top 30 countries were democracies. The Prosperity Index is reviewed and critiqued by an advisory panel of academics and scholars representing a range of disciplines and includes: Prof Tim Besley (London School of Economics); Dr. Daniel Drezner (Tufts University); Dr. Carol Graham (Brookings Institution); Dr. Edmund Malesky (University of California, San Diego); Dr. Ann Owen (Hamilton College).

Before joining the Legatum Institute, Mousavizadeh was CEO of ARC Ratings, an Emerging Market-based ratings agency. ARC Ratings was established in 2013 by a consortium of five Domestic Credit Rating Agencies operating in Asia, Africa, Europe and South America. With substantial cumulative resources, including over 10,000 clients, more than 600 ratings staff and an average ratings business record of over 20 years.

Tortoise Media
Mousavizadeh was a partner at Tortoise Media, from 2018 until 2022 and Director of the Tortoise Intelligence team. Tortoise Media is a journalistic platform, founded by James Harding, the Former Director of BBC News, Katie Vanneck-Smith, the former President of The Wall Street Journal and Matthew Barzun, Obama's former ambassador to the UK. Tortoise Media is developing a new approach to journalism; responding to the widening gap between powerful institutions and those entities able to scrutinize them. This approach is built around slower, more detailed, and discursive journalism; Tortoise Media calls it 'slow news'. She oversaw the development of the team's indices and data analytics projects as Director of Tortoise Intelligence team; which aims to contribute data-driven findings and to substantiate the slow news approach.

The Responsibility100 Index
 Alexandra published the Responsibility100 Index, in its first beta edition in September 2019; the Index ranks the companies of the FTSE 100 on there CSR contributions; with reference to the UN Sustainable Development Goals. The Index has already been recognised by a range of the companies and other non-governmental organisations, as a comprehensive expression of the action and commitment being made in alignment with the Sustainable Development Goals. The Index is composed of seven main sub-pillars; gender equality, climate, good business, waster, water, human rights and poverty. It contains 52 unique indicators and draws on over 5,000 data-points to build a dynamic portrait of each company in the ranking. The Index does, however, call for greater transparency and better reporting to expand this data-set. It is published quarterly from January 2020.

The Global AI Index
Alexandra, and her team, published the Global AI Index in December 2019. It was presented at the World Economic Forum in December 2020. The index will draw on a range of primary data to measure the capacity for artificial intelligence – specifically through the processes of innovation, investment and implementation – amongst OECD nations. The initial findings showed the wide margin in capacity between the US, China and the rest of the world. The index has been referenced extensively by governments as a benchmark for their national AI strategies. The Global AI Index has been featured in a number of publications, including WIRED, Politico, Irish Times, The South China Morning Post and Medium. The Global AI Index advisory board includes Stuart Russell, professor of computer science at the University of California, Berkeley, Azeem Azhar, creator of the Exponential View, Prince Zeid bin Ra'ad, a Jordanian former diplomat who is the Perry World House Professor of the Practice of Law and Human Rights at the University of Pennsylvania and the president and CEO of the International Peace Institute, Tabitha Goldstaub, Chair of the UK government's AI Council and a member of the Digital, Culture, Media and Sport Digital Economy Council, Paul Clarke, former Chief Technology Officer at Ocado, Sana Khareghani, former Head of UK Government Office for Artificial Intelligence, Chris Wigley, CEO at Genomics England, Christine Foster, Chief Product Officer, Data Science at Kantar Public, Ajay Bhalla, President of Mastercard's Cyber & Intelligence business and Doug Brown, Chief Data Scientist at Capita.

Evident 
Alexandra Mousavizadeh is currently the founder and CEO of Evident which is launching the Evident AI Index in January 2023. The Evident AI Index is the first public ranking of the largest companies in the world on their maturity in developing and using artificial intelligence. The Evident AI Index uses public data sources rather than survey data or interviews. It contains 190 indicators across 4 pillars focusing on ambition, talent, innovation and responsibility. It will rank more than 1,000 companies across a range of sectors and geographies (including North America, Europe and Middle East and Africa). It aims to create a global benchmark for measuring maturity in artificial intelligence.

Commentary 
Mousavizadeh has been appointed as a specialist judge for the World Data Visualization Prize, in partnership with the World Government Summit. Mousavizadeh's analysis has featured in a number of publications, including The Wall Street Journal, the Financial Times, The Moscow Times, Euromoney,
 and eNCA.

References

1970 births
Living people
University of Copenhagen alumni
Danish economists
Danish women economists
People from Copenhagen